Terem may refer to:
Terem (Russia), an upper story in buildings of historical Russia
Terem Palace, a building within the Kremlin in Moscow
Terem, Hungary, a village
TEREM, Bulgarian arms supplier for the Bulgarian armed forces
Terem Quartet,  musical ensemble from Saint Petersburg, Russia